Kevin Bowen (born July 3, 1993) is a former American football offensive tackle. He played college football at East Central University. Bowen was signed by the Washington Redskins as an undrafted free agent in 2016.

Professional career

Washington Redskins
On May 6, 2016, the Washington Redskins signed Bowen as an undrafted free agent after going unselected in the 2016 NFL Draft. The team waived/injured him on August 18, 2016. After clearing waivers, the Redskins placed him on injured reserve.

Bowen was waived/injured again on August 12, 2017. He was unclaimed and placed on the team's injured reserve for the second consecutive season.

On March 6, 2018, Bowen was waived by the Redskins.

Cleveland Browns
On July 30, 2018, Bowen signed with the Cleveland Browns. He was waived on August 28, 2018.

St. Louis BattleHawks
Bowen was drafted by the St. Louis BattleHawks in the 2020 XFL Supplemental Draft on November 22, 2019. He was placed on injured reserve on December 18, 2019. He had his contract terminated when the league suspended operations on April 10, 2020.

References

External links
 ECU Tigers bio
 Washington Redskins bio
 Cleveland Browns bio

1993 births
Living people
African-American players of American football
Players of American football from San Diego
American football offensive tackles
East Central Tigers football players
Washington Redskins players
Cleveland Browns players
St. Louis BattleHawks players
21st-century African-American sportspeople